Olivier Guégan (born 20 August 1972) is a French former professional footballer who currently manages French Ligue 2 side Sochaux. During his playing career he played as a midfielder.

Managerial career
In June 2014, he became the assistant coach at Stade de Reims. On 7 April 2015, Guégan became the new coach at Reims, after Jean-Luc Vasseur was sacked.

Managerial statistics

References

External links

1972 births
Living people
Association football midfielders
French footballers
French football managers
Angers SCO players
Paris FC players
Stade de Reims players
Stade Brestois 29 players
Ligue 2 players
People from Longjumeau
Stade de Reims managers
Grenoble Foot 38 managers
Valenciennes FC managers
FC Sochaux-Montbéliard managers
Footballers from Essonne
Ligue 1 managers
Ligue 2 managers
Brittany international footballers